USA Discounters, Ltd. (d/b/a USA Living and Fletcher's Jewelers) is an American retail company based in Norfolk, Virginia, United States. USA Discounters has been in business since 1991.

History
Collection Practices
In a July 2014 article, it was reported that USA Discounters seizes the pay of more active-duty military than any other company in the country, according to Department of Defense payroll data obtained by ProPublica.

USA Discounters issued a press release refuting the article, stating just "1%" of their military customers are subject to wage garnishment after all other actions are exhausted.

Name change 
In October 2014, USA Discounters announced a name change to "USA Living", however the name change was a store branding change only for the "USA Discounters" and "Fletcher's 
Jewelers" locations and the company's official name remained the same.

Bankruptcy  
In August 2015, USA Discounters filed Chapter 11 bankruptcy and began closing stores."

Official investigations
The company has been the target of investigations and official actions by the Consumer Financial Protection Bureau, the Colorado Attorney General, and the North Carolina Attorney General.

References

Retail companies of the United States
Companies based in Virginia
1991 establishments in Virginia
American companies established in 1991